Patteson Shoal is an outer reef in the Reef Islands, in the Solomon Islands province of Temotu. It is located about 50 km northeast of Nupani. The shoal is named for John Coleridge Patteson.

References

External links
 Patteson Shoal on Solomonislands.com.sb

Islands of the Solomon Islands